Points is an unincorporated community in Hampshire County in the U.S. state of West Virginia. According to the 2000 census, the Points community has a population of 478.

Points is named for its location at an intersection, namely where Jersey Mountain Road (West Virginia Secondary Route 5) and the old Springfield Grade Road (West Virginia Secondary Route 3) intersect. From Springfield to Points, the grade has been renamed Springfield Pike and from Points to Slanesville, it has been renamed Slanesville Pike.

References 

Unincorporated communities in Hampshire County, West Virginia
Unincorporated communities in West Virginia